Damban is a Local Government Area of Bauchi State, Nigeria. Its administrative headquarter is located in the town of Dambam.  It has two district Dagauda and Jalam

It has an area of 1,077 km and a population of 150,922 at the 2006 census.

The postal code of the area is 751.

History
Damban local government area is one of the local government areas in Bauchi state. It has its administrative headquarters in Damban town. It is located in north Bauchi and shares borders with Darazo, Misau, Katagum and Gamawa local government areas. The Dambam local government area council oversees the public administration in the local government area and the legislative council makes laws governing the local government area.

References

Local Government Areas in Bauchi State